Events from the 1190s in England.

Incumbents
Monarch – Richard I (to 6 April 1199), then John

Events
 1190
 6 February – massacre of almost all Jews in Norwich.
 7 March – massacre of Jews at Stamford Fair.
 16 March – a mob besieges 150 Jews in York Castle, killing those who do not commit suicide.
 18 March – massacre of 57 Jews at Bury St. Edmunds.
 4 July – Kings Richard I of England and Philip II of France set out from France to join the Third Crusade.
 Summer – William Longchamp arrests his co-regent Hugh de Puiset and rules alone as Lord Chancellor, Justiciar, and papal legate.
 First known foreign scholar commences study at what will become the University of Oxford, Emo of Friesland.
 1191
 12 May – Richard I marries Berengaria of Navarre on Cyprus; she will never visit England during his lifetime.
 12 July – Third Crusade: Siege of Acre ends with a crusader victory led by Philip II and Richard I.
 7 September – Third Crusade: Richard defeats Saladin at the Battle of Arsuf.
 October – Prince John of England deposes William Longchamp.
 27 November – Reginald fitz Jocelin elected Archbishop of Canterbury but dies before being consecrated.
 Monks at Glastonbury Abbey claim to have found the tomb of King Arthur and Queen Guinevere.
 1192
 5 August – Third Crusade: Richard defeats Saladin at the Battle of Jaffa.
 2 September – Treaty of Jaffa between Richard and Saladin allows Christian pilgrims to visit Jerusalem and ends the Third Crusade. Richard leaves the Holy Land in October.
 11 December – returning from the Crusade, Richard is taken prisoner by Leopold V, Duke of Austria, and secured at Dürnstein.
 Prince John recognised as heir to the throne, and takes control of the royal castles at Windsor and Wallingford.
 Rebuilding of Lincoln Cathedral begins.
 Richard of Devizes composes Chronicon de rebus gestis Ricardi Primi.
 1193
 14 February – Richard I is handed to custody of Henry VI, Holy Roman Emperor, and moved to Speyer.
 29 May – Hubert Walter enthroned as Archbishop of Canterbury.
 1194
 4 February – Richard I ransomed from captivity.
 c. 10 February – Henry Marshal is nominated Bishop of Exeter.
 12 March–28 March – Richard returns to England and besieges Nottingham Castle to reclaim it from his brother John.
 17 April – second coronation of Richard I at Winchester.
 2 May – Portsmouth granted a Royal Charter; dock ordered to be built here.
 12 May – after settling affairs in England, Richard I leaves for Barfleur in Normandy to reclaim lands lost to Philip II of France.
 3 July – Battle of Fréteval: Richard I reconquers his French fiefdoms from Philip II.
 Hubert Walter appointed as Justiciar.
 September: Articles of Eyre proclaimed
 Hubert Walter establishes the office of coroner.
 Ordinance of the Jewry: for taxation purposes, records are to be kept of financial transactions. England elected to be served financially by Jews, hence the eponym.
 1195
 Treaty of Louviers suspends war between England and France; France takes control of Norman Vexin.
 Bushmead Priory founded.
 New stone Lydford Castle built in the Forest of Dartmoor.
 1196
 Spring – in London, a popular uprising of the poor against the rich is led by William Fitz Osbern.
 Assize of Measures establishes the ell as the standard English measure, and regulates the production of cloth.
 1197
 A statute establishes standard weights and measures.
 1198
 June – England resumes its war against France, re-occupying Norman Vexin.
 June 23 – fire at Bury St Edmunds Abbey.
 September – Battle of Gisors: English victory over the French.
 1199
 13 January – short-lived truce between England and France.
 6 April – King Richard I dies of a wound received at the siege of the castle of Châlus in France.
 27 May – coronation of King John of England, Richard's brother.
 Hubert Walter appointed as Lord Chancellor.
 King Philip II of France renews his war against England, supporting the rival claim to the English throne of Arthur of Brittany.
 St John's Jerusalem at Sutton-at-Hone, Kent, established as a Commandry of the Knights Hospitaller.
 St Laurence's Church, Ludlow, is rebuilt.

Births
 1193
William de Ferrers, 5th Earl of Derby (died 1254)
 1195
Roger de Quincy, 2nd Earl of Winchester (died 1265)
 1197
Richard of Chichester, bishop, canonised (died 1253)

Deaths
 1190
 19 November – Baldwin of Exeter, Archbishop of Canterbury
 Ranulf de Glanvill, chief justiciar
 Robert de Beaumont, 3rd Earl of Leicester
 1191
 26 December – Reginald fitz Jocelin Archbishop-elect of Canterbury
 1194
Abbas Benedictus, abbot of Peterborough
 1195
Hugh de Puiset, bishop of Durham (born c. 1125)
 1196
William Fitz Osbern, London citizen
 1197
William Longchamp, Lord Chancellor
 1198
William of Newburgh, historian (born c. 1136)
 1199
 6 April – Richard I of England (killed in battle) (born 1157)
 4 September – Joan of England, Queen of Sicily, wife of William II of Sicily (born 1165)
 uncertain
 William Fitzstephen, servant of Thomas Becket and sheriff of Gloucester

References